Samsung Galaxy M21 is a mid-range Android smartphone developed by Samsung Electronics as a part of Galaxy M series smartphone lineup for 2020. It was first released on March 18, 2020 as the successor to the Galaxy M20 and Galaxy M30s. It comes preinstalled with Android 10 and Samsung's custom One UI 2.0 software overlay, which is now upgraded to Android 12 with One UI 4.1.

Samsung Galaxy M21 has an improved version of itself, the Samsung Galaxy M21s, released in 6 November, 2020.

Specifications

Hardware 

The phone features 6.4-inch, FHD+ Super AMOLED panel with rounded corners, screen-to-body ratio of 91% and 19.5:9 aspect ratio. The front glass is constructed of Corning Gorilla Glass 3. There is a rear-mounted fingerprint scanner on the polycarbonate plastic back.

The camera system of the phone is similar to Samsung Galaxy M30s. It comprises 3 rear cameras:

 48 MP, 1/2.0" main sensor with f/2.0 aperture, 0.8 µm pixel size, 80° field of view
 8 MP, 1/4.0" ultra-wide lens with f/2.2 aperture, 1.12 µm pixel size,123° field of view
 5 MP depth sensor with f/2.2 aperture

An infinity-U screen cut-out on the front houses a single 20 MP selfie camera lens with f/2.2 aperture. Rear camera is capable of recording video up to 4K at 30 fps and front camera can record videos up to 1080p at 30fps 

A large 6000 mAh Li-Po battery is charged over adaptive fast charging of 15-watts.

Software 

The phone comes with Android 10 and Samsung's custom One UI Core 2.0 software overlay. The phone received One UI 3.0 update based on Android 11 on 27 January 2021 and One UI 3.1 on 31 March 2021. The phone also features on the list where Samsung smartphones released after 2019 have been committed to receive updates for a minimum of 4 years, however if the committed security updates will translate into next Android version upgrades is yet to be cleared by Samsung.

References

Samsung
Samsung Galaxy